Czech Republic–Mexico relations are the diplomatic relations between the Czech Republic and Mexico. Both countries are members of the Organisation for Economic Co-operation and Development and the United Nations.

History

Mexico established diplomatic relations with then Czechoslovakia in 1922; four years after the country proclaimed its independence from the Austro-Hungarian Empire. That same year, both nations opened consulates in each other's capitals, respectively. Diplomatic relations between the two nations were interrupted in April 1939 after the invasion from Germany in the country, however, the exiled Czechoslovak government in London maintained relations with Mexico. In 1942, diplomatic relations were fully restored between the two nations and in 1959, embassies were established in each other's capitals, respectively.

In August 1990, Czechoslovak President Václav Havel paid an official visit to Mexico. In 1991, Mexican President Carlos Salinas de Gortari paid an official visit to Czechoslovakia. In December 1992, Czechoslovakia was split into the Czech Republic and Slovakia. Mexico established diplomatic relations with the Czech Republic on 1 January 1993. 

In May 2022, the Czech Republic and Mexico celebrated 100 years of the establishment of diplomatic relations.

High-level visits
High-level visits form Czechoslovakia/Czech Republic to Mexico
 President Václav Havel (August 1990)
 President Václav Havel (October 1993)
 Prime Minister Miloš Zeman (April 2002)
 Foreign Vice-Minister David Gladis (June 2007)
 Foreign Vice-Minister  Helena Bambasová (October 2008)
 Foreign Vice-Minister Ivan Jančárek (June 2015)
 Foreign Minister Tomáš Petříček (October 2019)

High-level visits from Mexico to Czechoslovakia/Czech Republic
 President Carlos Salinas de Gortari (July 1991)
 President Vicente Fox (October 2001)
 Foreign Undersecretary Lourdes Aranda (November 2005)
 Foreign Secretary Patricia Espinosa Cantellano (May 2009)
 Foreign Undersecretary Carmen Moreno Toscano (May 2022)

Bilateral agreements
Both nations have signed a few bilateral agreements such as an Agreement on Air Transportation (1990); Agreement on Educational and Cultural Cooperation (1970); Agreement on Trade (1974); Agreement on Health Cooperation (1993); Agreement on Scientific, Technical and Technological Cooperation (1995); Agreement on the Elimination of Visa Requirements for Ordinary, Diplomatic and Official Passport Holders (2000); Agreement on the Avoidance of Double-Taxation and Fiscal Evasion (2002) and an Agreement on Reciprocal Promotion and Protection of Investment (2004).

Trade relations
In 1997, Mexico signed a Free Trade Agreement with the European Union (which includes the Czech Republic since 2004). In 2018, two-way trade between both nations amounted to US$1.7 billion. The Czech Republic main exports to Mexico include: vehicles; directional lights; electrical conductors and modular circuits. Mexico's main exports to the Czech Republic include: headphones with microphone; games and construction assortment; memory units; vehicles; crusts of citrus fruits, melons and watermelons. The Czech Republic is Mexico's fourteenth biggest trading partner within the European Union. A few major Mexican multinational companies such as Cemex, Grupo Bimbo and Nemak operate in the Czech Republic.

Resident diplomatic missions
 Czech Republic has an embassy in Mexico City.
 Mexico has an embassy in Prague.

See also 
 Foreign relations of the Czech Republic
 Foreign relations of Mexico
 Czech Mexicans

References 

 
Mexico
Bilateral relations of Mexico